The short-tailed parrotbill (Neosuthora davidiana) is a species of bird in the family Paradoxornithidae.
It is found in China, Laos, Myanmar, Thailand, and Vietnam.
Its natural habitat is subtropical or tropical moist lowland forests.

References

Robson, C. (2007). Family Paradoxornithidae (Parrotbills) pp.  292–321; in del Hoyo, J., Elliott, A. & Christie, D.A. eds. Handbook of the Birds of the World, Vol. 12. Picathartes to Tits and Chickadees. Lynx Edicions, Barcelona.

short-tailed parrotbill
short-tailed parrotbill
Birds of South China
Birds of Laos
Birds of Thailand
Birds of Yunnan
short-tailed parrotbil
Taxonomy articles created by Polbot